Physical inventory is a process where a business physically counts its entire inventory.  A physical inventory may be mandated by financial accounting rules or the tax regulations to place an accurate value on the inventory, or the business may need to count inventory so component parts or raw materials can be restocked.  Businesses may use several different tactics to minimize the disruption caused by physical inventory.

Inventory services provide labor and automation to quickly count inventory and minimize shutdown time.
Inventory control system software can speed the physical inventory process.
A perpetual inventory system tracks the receipt and use of inventory, and calculates the quantity on hand.
Cycle counting, an alternative to physical inventory, may be less disruptive.

The Finance or Business Manager of the unit is responsible for ensuring
the annual physical inventory is properly performed, inventory records
reflect actual quantities on hand, inventory valuation methods are
appropriate, and adjustments are entered in the business's accounting
system on a timely basis.
In addition, the Finance or Business Manager is responsible for ensuring
that segregation of duties is maintained throughout the inventory process
to promote the safeguarding of the assets, protection of employees, and
objective reporting of inventory. Specifically, no one person should be
able to authorize a transaction (e.g., a purchase or sale), record the
transaction, have custody of the inventory, and perform the related
reconciliation.

See also
 Logistics
 Inventory control system
 Inventory management software
 Stock-taking

Inventory